Defender of the Faith ( or, specifically feminine,) is a phrase that has been used as part of the full style of many English, Scottish, and later British monarchs since the early 16th century. It has also been used by some other monarchs and heads of state.

Scottish, English and British usage

History

The earliest use of the term appears in 1507, when King James IV of Scotland was granted the title of "Protector and Defender of the Christian Faith" by Pope Julius II.  The title was conferred on James IV by the papal legate Robert Bellenden in a lavish ceremony in Holyrood Abbey.

"Defender of the Faith" has been one of the subsidiary titles of the English and later British monarchs since it was granted on 11 October 1521 by Pope Leo X to King Henry VIII. His wife Catherine of Aragon also used the title. The title was conferred in recognition of Henry's book Assertio Septem Sacramentorum (Defence of the Seven Sacraments), which defended the sacramental nature of marriage and the supremacy of the pope. This was also known as the "Henrician Affirmation" and was seen as an important opposition to the early stages of the Protestant Reformation, especially the ideas of Martin Luther.

Following Henry's decision to break with Rome in 1530 and establish himself as head of the Church of England, the title was revoked by Pope Paul III and he was excommunicated. However in 1543 the Parliament of England conferred (by a bill entitled "The Bill for the Kinges Stile") on King Henry VIII and his successors, now the defenders of the Anglican faith, the style "Henry the Eighth by the Grace of God King of England, France and Ireland, Defender of the Faith and of the Church of England and also of Ireland in Earth the Supreme Head". All subsequent monarchs (except the Catholic Queen Mary I) became  supreme governors.

King James V of Scotland was granted the title of "Defender of the Faith" by Pope Paul III on 19 January 1537, symbolizing the hopes of the papacy that the King of Scots would resist the path that his uncle Henry VIII had followed. Neither this title nor James IV's title of "Protector and Defender of the Christian Faith" became part of the full style of the monarch of Scotland.

During The Protectorate (1653–59), the republican heads of state Oliver Cromwell and Richard Cromwell, more clearly profiled as Protestant than the monarchy, although claiming divine sanction, did not adopt the style "Defender of the Faith". The style was reintroduced after the restoration of the monarchy and remains in use to this day.

Modern usage

In his capacity as King of the United Kingdom, Charles III is styled "Charles the Third, by the Grace of God of the United Kingdom of Great Britain and Northern Ireland and of His other Realms and Territories King, Head of the Commonwealth, Defender of the Faith". The title "Defender of the Faith" reflects the Sovereign's position as the supreme governor of the Church of England. The original Latin phrase  is represented on all current British coins by the abbreviations F D or FID DEF. This notation was first added to British coins in 1714, during the reign of King George I. The decision of the Royal Mint to omit this and certain other parts of the monarch's style from the "Godless Florin" in 1849 caused such a scandal that the coin was replaced.

In most Commonwealth realms, the phrase does not appear in the Monarch's full style, though the initial "By the Grace of God" is maintained. For example, in Australia, King Charles is currently styled "by the Grace of God, King of Australia and His other Realms and Territories, Head of the Commonwealth". He is additionally styled "Defender of the Faith" only in Canada, New Zealand and the UK. Canada chose to include the phrase not because the sovereign is regarded as the protector of the state religion (Canada has none), but as a defender of faith in general. In a speech to the House of Commons in 1953, Prime Minister Louis St. Laurent stated:

However, the style used on Canadian coinage is simply D.G. Rex ("By the Grace of God, King").

In Australia, the monarch held the title "Defender of the Faith" until 1973, when it was formally removed. (The words "by the Grace of God" were retained, however.)

At various times, some countries of the Commonwealth retained the title until they formally became republics, e.g. South Africa from 29 May 1953. Others dropped it even sooner, e.g. in 1953, while still a dominion of the Commonwealth (until 1956), Pakistan dropped the title in recognition of the contradiction between its overwhelmingly Muslim population and having a monarch as the defender of the Christian faith.

King Charles III, the then heir apparent, expressed a preference to change the spirit of this role should he succeed to the throne as expected. He commented in 1994, "I personally would rather see [my future role] as Defender of Faith, not the Faith"; however, he later clarified in 2015 that "while at the same time being Defender of the Faith you can also be protector of faiths".

Usage in the French language

Haiti
In 1811 when he proclaimed himself king, Henri I of Haiti awarded himself the title, "", and incorporated it into his full style:   which translates to English as: by the Grace of God and the Constitutional Law of the State, King of Haiti, Sovereign of Tortuga, Gonâve and other adjacent Islands, Destroyer of Tyranny, Regenerator and Benefactor of the Haitian Nation, Creator of her Moral, Political and Martial Institutions, First Crowned Monarch of the New World, Defender of the Faith, founder of the Royal and Military Order of Saint-Henry

Canada

The French variant is used as part of the official French-language version of the monarch's style in Canada: ""

Elsewhere
In 1684, Pope Innocent XI granted the honorary title  to John III Sobieski, king of Poland, who took the supreme command of the Christian Coalition army during the Battle of Vienna, considered as a turning point in history of Europe, preventing it from being conquered by the Ottoman Empire.

One of the titles of Haile Selassie I, Emperor of Ethiopia, was Defender of the Faith.

In Sunni Islam, the historical leader of the faith was a secular ruler, rather than a spiritual one. The title of this leader was Caliph, deriving from the Arabic Khalifah, which can be loosely translated to "steward", "deputy", or "successor" (as the Caliph was the successor to the Prophet Muhammad, and the steward of his community on Earth). An additional title used by Caliphs was Amir al-Mu'minin, meaning "Commander (Emir) of the Faithful". This title is still used by leaders who have historically claimed the Caliphate but officially do so no longer, like the King of Morocco and the Sultan of Sokoto. The secular ruler responsible for the maintenance and stewardship of the Masjid al-Haram in Mecca and the Mosque of the Prophet in Medina, as well as protecting the Hajj pilgrimage and its rituals, is called the Custodian of the Two Holy Mosques. This title is currently held by the King of Saudi Arabia.

In Nizari Shia Islam, the leader of the faith is known as the Aga Khan. The word "agha" means "master" or "lord", and "khan" is a title of rulership in Turkic and Mongolic cultures.

The leaders of various micronations, such as the Christian emperor of Austenasia, have also assumed the title.

Similar titles
The monarchs of other countries have received similar titles from the pope:
 Hungary: Apostolic Majesty (awarded )
 France: Most Christian Majesty (awarded )
 Spain: Most Catholic Majesty (awarded in 1493)
 Germany: Defensor Ecclesiae (Protector of the Church; awarded to Holy Roman Emperors)
 Portugal: Most Faithful Majesty (awarded in 1748)

See also
 By the Grace of God
 
 Style of the British sovereign
 
  (Commander of the Faithful) in Islam

Notes

References

Latin religious words and phrases
History of the Church of England
Monarchy in Canada
Monarchy in Haiti
16th-century Christianity
Style of the British sovereign